Podaga (also) is a Polabian deity who had his statue in a temple in Plön. Mentioned only in Helmold's Chronicle, which does not give a depiction or function of the deity.

According to Aleksander Brückner, it is impossible to read the name Podaga. Grigoriy Il'inskiy concluded that Podaga is another form of Dazhbog (from *Podabog), while Roman Jakobson concluded that Podaga is a corrupted notation of Dazhbog.

Mikołaj Rudnicki connected the Podaga notation with the name Dagome in Dagome iudex referring to Mieszko I. According to him, both words are related to each other. The word was supposed to have come to the Piast state through Mieszko's unknown wife, who brought with her the cult of the goddess Podaga. He connected both names with the Proto-Slavic *dag- "to burn", and also with Długosz's Pogoda, whose name was supposed to have been distorted.

Leszek Moszyński was the first to link Podaga with the Polish word potęga "power, might". According to him, the stem -dag- corresponds to the Proto-Slavic *tǫgъ "strong, stout", and the whole Latin notation Podaga corresponds to the Proto-Slavic *Potǫga, and the deity would be a divinized power, might (identical to adjective *potǫga "power, might"). Krzysztof Tomasz Witczak commented positively on this reading in his article on the reading of the Latin name Dagome from Dagome iudex. He reads Dag- in Dagome also as Polish Tęg- (PS *Tǫg-), and the whole name as Tęgomir, or the abbreviation from this name, Tęgom (PS *Tǫgomirъ, *Tǫgomъ). He refers to the examples of transcription of the nasal o (Polish ą) by the letter a in German records, e.g. Dabe ← Polish Dąbie, as well as fluctuations between d and t when typing Slavic ⟨d⟩, e.g. the name Oda in Dagome iudex is noted as Ote.

This etymology was supported by Michał Łuczyński. He reminds us of Brückner's remark that the theonym given by Helmold must refer to a male deity, not a female one, since otherwise he would have called the deity dea (Latin "goddess"), and not just idolum, and this means that the final -a in Podaga requires explanation. The final vowel -a sometimes appeared after the preceding consonant ⟨k⟩, e.g., Latin Misaca, Misica, Misuka ← Polish Mieszek, Latin *Licica ← Polish *Leszek, from which it can be concluded that -a may also have appeared after the consonant ⟨g⟩. With this in mind, and taking into account and supporting the reading of the Latin -dag- as -tęg-/*-tǫg-, Łuczyński reads the Proto-Slavic form of theonym as *Potǫgъ. This is supported by the Old Polish personal name *Potąg, reconstructed on the basis of the village of Potęgowo, as well as the personal name *Nietąg (name with negation) from the 13th century.

According to Henryk Łowmiański the cult of Podaga was a cult arranged by prince Kruto and not a tribal cult, because the creation of an independent deity, erecting a temple and a statue of him would have exceeded the capabilities of a small territorial unit. According to Łuczyński, the new temple (probably dedicated to a new god) was supposed to raise the authority of the prince's power. According to him, Potag should therefore be considered an epithet of Perun, which would have a Rus' analogy in the form of the creation of an official state cult established in Kyiv by Vladimir the Great. Potag would thus originally have been a given name, and as an adjective of the deity it was eventually recognized as a separate theonym, at first as an alternate name for Perun.

References

Bibliography 

 
 
 
 
 
 
 
 
 
 

Slavic gods